The Little Prince  is a 1966 Soviet film directed by Arūnas Žebriūnas, based on the fairy tale of the same name by Antoine de Saint-Exupéry.

Cast
 Evaldas Mikaliūnas as boy
 Donatas Banionis as adult  (voiced by Alexander Demyanenko)
 Otar Koberidze as pilot
 Innokenty Smoktunovsky as narrator

References

External links 
 

1966 films
Russian children's drama films
Works based on The Little Prince
Dystopian films
Soviet-era Lithuanian films
1960s fantasy films
Films about princes
Soviet children's films